This article lists the confirmed squads for the 2017 Men's EuroHockey Nations Championship tournament held in Amstelveen, Netherlands between 18 and 27 August 2020. The eight national teams were required to register a playing squad of eighteen players and two reserves.

Pool A

Austria
The following was the Austria squad for the 2017 EuroHockey Championship.

Head coach:  Cedric D'Souza

Belgium
The following was the Belgium squad for the 2017 EuroHockey Championship.

Head coach:  Shane McLeod

Netherlands
The following was the Netherlands squad for the 2017 EuroHockey Championship.

Head coach:  Maximiliano Caldas

Spain
The following was the Spain squad for the 2017 EuroHockey Championship.

Head coach:  Fred Soyez

Pool B

England
The following was the England squad for the 2017 EuroHockey Championship.

Head coach: Bobby Crutchley

Germany
The following was the Germany squad for the 2017 EuroHockey Championship.

Head coach: Stefan Kermas

Ireland
The following was the Ireland squad for the 2017 EuroHockey Championship.

Head coach:  Craig Fulton

Poland
The following was the Poland squad for the 2017 EuroHockey Championship.

Head coach: Karol Sniezek

References

Squads
EuroHockey Nations Championship squads